Loimaa railway station (Finnish Loimaan asema; Swedish Loimaa station) is located in the town of Loimaa, Finland. The station is located almost exactly halfway between the Turku Central and Toijala railway stations, making it an important place along the track.

The station was taken into use when the track was completed in 1876. The station building was probably designed by Knut Nylander, who was the building designer of the VR Group at that time. The plans for the station haven't been signed, however.

The station is located in the central area of the town of Loimaa, at the crossing point of the railroad, Finnish National Road 9 and Finnish local road 213. All passenger trains stop at Loimaa, and it also serves cargo traffic.

Sources 

Railway stations in Southwest Finland
Railway station
Railway stations opened in 1876